Henry Haughton Reynolds-Moreton, Lord Moreton DL (4 March 1857 – 28 February 1920), was a British Liberal Party politician.

Moreton was the son of Henry Reynolds-Moreton, 3rd Earl of Ducie, and his wife Julia (née Langston). He entered Parliament for Gloucestershire West in the 1880 general election, a seat he held until 1885. He married Ada Margarette Smith on 18 December 1888 and had no issue.

He edited a glossary of old Gloucestershire words and phrases (published in 1890), to which he also contributed a list of dialect words from Tortworth, where he lived at Tortworth Court.

Lord Moreton died in February 1920, aged 62, predeceasing his father by one year. His uncle Hon. Berkeley Basil Moreton later succeeded in the earldom.

References 
Notes

Sources
 Kidd, Charles, Williamson, David (editors). Debrett's Peerage and Baronetage (1990 edition). New York: St Martin's Press, 1990,

External links 
 

1857 births
1920 deaths
People from Gloucestershire
Deputy Lieutenants of Gloucestershire
Deputy Lieutenants of Oxfordshire
Liberal Party (UK) MPs for English constituencies
UK MPs 1880–1885
Heirs apparent who never acceded
British courtesy barons and lords of Parliament